Emma Lyons (born 14 June 1987) is an English female athlete who competes in the pole vault. She has a personal best performance of 4.31 metres.

Athletics career
Lyons competed for England at the 2010 Commonwealth Games in Delhi, India finishing 7th. The previous year she had placed 12th at the 2009 European Athletics Under 23 Championships in Kaunas, Lithuania. Lyons also won a gold medal at the 2008 British Championships which also served as the Olympic Trials in the same year.

References

1987 births
Living people
English female pole vaulters
British female pole vaulters
Commonwealth Games competitors for England
Athletes (track and field) at the 2010 Commonwealth Games
British Athletics Championships winners